Poulton is a former civil parish, now in the parish of Poulton and Pulford, in Cheshire West and Chester, England.  It contains seven listed buildings, all of which are designated by English Heritage at Grade II, and included in the National Heritage List for England.  This grade is the lowest of the three gradings given to listed buildings and is applied to "buildings of national importance and special interest".  The parish is entirely rural, and forms part of the estate of the Dukes of Westminster.  The listed buildings are all domestic, consisting of houses and a lodge.

References
Citations

Sources

Listed buildings in Cheshire West and Chester
Lists of listed buildings in Cheshire